Saša Radulović (or ; born 7 June 1965) is a Serbian engineer, economist and politician. He is a former Minister of Economy of Serbia and the president of Enough is Enough, a political movement in Serbia, for whom he ran for president in the 2017 Serbian presidential election. He served as a member of the National Assembly of Serbia from 2016 to 2020.

Early life
Born in Bihać to a Yugoslav People's Army (JNA) officer father, Radulović graduated from the University of Sarajevo's Faculty of Electrical Engineering, specializing in automation and electronics.

In the 1980s, Radulović was part of the New Primitivism cultural movement created in Sarajevo, together with Emir Kusturica and members of the rock band Zabranjeno Pušenje. His close associate Dušan Pavlović also comes from 1980s Yugoslav pop culture, as a former member of the Belgrade-based band Vampiri.

His father, Budimir Radulović (Chief of the Army Medical Corps and other authorities), was killed on May 3, 1992 in the Yugoslav People's Army column incident in Sarajevo.

He emigrated from the Socialist Republic of Serbia at the end of the 1980s. He lived and worked in several countries, including the United States, Canada, and Germany.

Professional career
In 1989, Radulović emigrated from Yugoslavia to Germany. The following year, he began working at Siemens AG on system monitoring for nuclear plants located in Germany, United States, and Russia. The job required him to move to the U.S.

In 1994, he began working in Toronto, Canada, for Antares Alliance, a subsidiary of Amdahl/EDS, as a relational database development team manager, before switching to Interpro Medical Network, initially as vice president of development, and then as one of the members the Board of Directors. From 1997 to 2001 he was the general manager of the company dealing with servers for TrueSpectre pictures. Together with colleagues from the company, he designed the architecture and algorithms that process images on the servers. From 2002 to 2006 he was an advisor to several investment companies.

Radulović came back to Serbia from the United States in 2005, and became a pioneer blogger, writing on economics, business and tax reforms. Professionally, he owned a company and worked as bankruptcy trustee for several other companies. He is licensed as a bankruptcy trustee and portfolio manager.

Radulović worked as Advisor to the Council of Europe, OSCE, US Embassy, GIZ, NALED, and the Association of Small and Medium Enterprises. He also provided training to the Serbian police and prosecutors on how to prosecute financial crimes.

Minister of Economy
In August 2013, Radulović was appointed as non-partisan Minister of Economy in the SNS-led government. During his brief tenure, he attempted to pass a new labor law package, which was initially supported by the government. Radulović's labor package proposed significant changes in labor union laws, such that labor union leaders would lose legal protections. The package also included some austerity measures, such as allowing employers to reduce compensation for annual leave, and for the reduction of sick leave provided that a bonus is paid during the year. The package was intensely opposed by Serbian labor union leaders, as the Federation of Independent Unions and the United Branch Union "Independence" both called for Radulović to resign due to his proposals. However, in January 2014, the government scrapped the Radulović package and began re-drafting. As a result of the government's rejection of his package, Radulović resigned from his position as Minister.

He came to the fore for a text in the magazine Nedeljnik in which he fiercely criticized their former economic policy in Serbia, including the privatization process and the associated corruption. The text is often cited not only in Serbian, but also in the media other former Yugoslav states. He was openly criticized by Prime Minister Aleksandar Vučić when he resigned. Radulović resigned from the post of Minister filed on 24 January 2014.

Political career
On 2 February 2014, Radulović announced that he would participate in the parliamentary elections on 16 March 2014 with his own list. His movement Dosta je bilo (Enough is Enough) garnered 74,973 votes (2.09%), remaining below the 5% threshold.  His list had been the only one to publish a consolidated electoral programme with action plans on different policy areas.

At the 2016 Serbian parliamentary election, his movement Dosta je bilo tripled its support and with 6.02% of votes it obtained 16 seats. Radulović became a member of the parliament and the leader of the Enough is Enough parliamentary group.

2017 presidential campaign
Radulović initially did not prioritize running for president, as he first proposed that Saša Janković and Vuk Jeremić come to an agreement on a "united candidate" against Aleksandar Vučić. In his case for uniting the opposition, Radulović argued that "Enough is Enough is the leader of the center, Vuk Jeremić is the new leader of the right of center, and Saša Janković - left of center." Večernje Novosti reported that Janković rejected the offer, while Jeremić's campaign allegedly did not respond. On March 2, 2017, Radulović announced his candidacy for the Serbian presidential election, only a month before the election. A week before the election, Nedeljnik published an essay written by Radulović, titled "When I become president", in an appeal to the voters. In the essay, he argued against party employment and outlines some of his ideas on welfare and taxes:

Radulović ended up with 1.41% of the national vote. Vladimir Vuletić, a sociology professor at the University of Belgrade, commented that "after last year's parliamentary election, it seemed that [Radulović] represented some kind of future of the opposition. Now that ambition and hope has completely collapsed."

Economic views
Although Radulović was not able to pass his ideas through the government during his tenure as Minister of Economy, he elaborated on his economic views for B92's blog in June 2013, in a post called "Which economic measures do we need?". His post had seven sections, each devoted to a different topic. In the first section, titled "How to save the economy", he summarized some of his key points with the following:

Later in the first section, he said that there should be "draconic" consequences for false financial reporting. He argued that all businesses in reconstruction should be sent to bankruptcy, except for public companies, for whom he wrote a deadline of three months should be given to list their financial responsibilities and their assets in exchange for reconstruction. He wrote that the Republic of Serbia's Fund for Development should be abolished, and argued against the creation of a development bank in Serbia. He wrote in favor of investment funds as an alternative to a development bank, and that the state should "offer them a portion of capital" in exchange for their investments. The first section was concluded with criticism for monopolies and corporate merging in Serbia.

In the second section, he wrote about tax policy and compensation in public companies. He wrote that salaries in public companies should be reduced by 10 to 20 percent assuming no workers are laid off. However, Radulović wrote that if workers are laid off, any salary reduction should take the layoffs in account such that the more layoffs, the less reductions in salary should be made. He called for the lowest tier of the value-added tax to be raised from 8% to 10%. For corporations, he wrote that taxes on corporate profits should be raised from 15% to 20%.

Political positions
In the beginning of his political career he was known for moderately liberal political and economic positions. Since 2018 and hiatus in the movement, his positions have taken a hard turn toward conservatism, identitarianism and alt-right ideology. Since early 2019 he and members of the movement refer to themselves as "Suverenisti", which loosely translates to sovereign citizen. He is strongly opposed to Middle Eastern immigrants being granted asylum in Serbia, commonly expresses heavy criticism of the Serbian mainstream media, calling them "propaganda channels" and "the enemy of the Serbian people, the state and democracy", and often accuses political opponents of treason and collaboration with "occupiers and colonizers".

He has been described a nationalist, anti-vaxxer and as opposed to immigration.

Breakup of Yugoslavia
In an interview with Nedeljnik from April 2016, Radulović talked about his childhood in Bosnia, his father's death in a confrontation by the Army of the Republic of Bosnia and Herzegovina, and war crimes. When commenting on the Bosnian War, he talked about the denial and justification of war crimes in the Balkans:

On 6 March 2018, Radulović resigned the post of the President of the Enough is Enough movement. However, he reassumed the post of movement's president in October 2019.

COVID-19 pandemic
Radulović is one of the most vocal critics of the approach to the COVID-19 pandemic taken by the Serbian government as well as most other world governments, calling mask mandates and lockdowns imposed by the Serbian and other governments a threat to civil liberties while also often accusing the mainstream media of spreading fear and hysteria by portraying the SARS‑CoV‑2 virus as far more dangerous than it objectively is. He has also made claims that COVID-19 vaccination is the cause of the late 2020 and early 2021 global wave of infections, challenged beliefs that mass immunization is the only way to end the pandemic and questioned the origins of the virus, leading critics to label him an anti-vaxxer and conspiracy theorist. Radulović has repeatedly dismissed these labels and claims that he and his political movement are neither denying the dangers of the virus nor arguing against vaccination, but merely advocating freedom of choice and stricter testing and control of vaccines before they are approved for use.

Personal life
Radulović has two children. Apart from his native Serbian language, he speaks English and German. Although Radulović was born in Bihać, he grew up in Sarajevo, where he lived until 1989 when he emigrated to Germany.

References

External links

 Saša Radulović at blog.b92.net
 Saša Radulović at linkedin.com
 
 

1965 births
Living people
People from Bihać
Serbs of Bosnia and Herzegovina
University of Sarajevo alumni
Serbian democracy activists
Serbian economists
Serbian expatriates in Canada
Candidates for President of Serbia
Enough is Enough (party) politicians
Members of the National Assembly (Serbia)
Serbian engineers
Serbian conspiracy theorists
Serbian nationalists